Ruth Ansel is an American graphic designer. She became a co-art director of Harper's Bazaar in the 1960s alongside Bea Feitler. In the 1970s she was art director of The New York Times Magazine and in the 1980s House & Garden, Vanity Fair, and Vogue. She was the first female to hold these positions.

Biography 
After graduating with a Fine Arts degree from Alfred University in 1957, Ansel started working under Bob Cato at Columbia Records. She married designer Bob Gill who introduced her to the "New York Design Mafia" - George Lois, Robert Brownjohn, Saul Bass, and Ivan Chermayeff - but the couple later split.

In 1961, Ansel started working at Harper's Bazaar in the Art Department, which at the time was under the directorship of Marvin Israel. Under Israel, she developed a critical eye and to create tension on the page. In 1963, Israel was fired after a falling out with editor-in-chief, Nancy White, Ruth Ansel and Bea Feitler became co-art directors of Harper's Bazaar. It was in collaboration with Bea Feitler and Richard Avedon that Ruth Ansel produced the now iconic April 1965 cover of Jean Shrimpton with a winking eye and a bright pink "helmet" that was cut and pasted from day-glo paper. In 1974, she left Harper's to become the first female art director of The New York Times Magazine. In 1983, she revamped House & Garden and in the 1984 joined Vanity Fair as art director. Ansel has collaborated for over four decades with photographers, illustrators and artists such as Richard Avedon, Andy Warhol, Peter Beard, Bruce Weber and Annie Leibovitz.

In 1992, Ansel opened her own design studio where she continues to produce groundbreaking content today. In the past she designed the Dark Odyssey by Phillip Jones Griffiths, The Sixties by Richard Avedon, Women and The White Oak Dance Project by Annie Leibovitz. She has also produced ad campaigns for Versace, Club Monaco, and Karl Lagerfeld. Current projects include a book for photographer Jerry Schatzberg and a book on the life and work of jewelry designer Elsa Peretti.

In 2008, the Wolfsonian-FIU organized an exhibition titled, The Thoughts on Democracy: Reinterpreting Norman Rockwell’s Four Freedoms. Ansel was one of 55 leading designers invited to contribute a poster based on the "Four Freedoms" posters created in 1943 by American illustrator Norman Rockwell. In 2009 she was invited to present her work at Moderna Museet in Stockholm, Sweden. In 2010 Hall of Femmes: Ruth Ansel was published, a book designed by Hjarta Smarta, highlighting her forty-year career and taking a look at what it was like to be the first female in these positions. In 2011, Ansel was the recipient of the Art Director's Club prestigious Hall of Fame Award.

Awards

 The Gold Medal for Design, The Art Directors Clubs, 1970  
 Design Award for Continuing Excellence in Publication Design by the Society of Publication (Special Tribute)  
 Hall of Fame Award, The Art Directors Club, 2011  
 AIGA Medalist, 2016

References 

Living people
Alfred University alumni
American graphic designers
Women graphic designers
The New York Times people
Vanity Fair (magazine) people
1938 births
AIGA medalists
American women graphic designers